Ukraine competed at the 2020 Summer Olympics in Tokyo. Originally scheduled to take place from 24 July to 9 August 2020, the Games were postponed to 23 July to 8 August 2021, due to the worldwide COVID-19 pandemic. It was the nation's seventh consecutive appearance at the Summer Olympics in the post-Soviet era with its smallest representation ever.

Ukraine racked up 19 medals in Tokyo, a significant improvement over its 2016 output of 11 medals, which was the lowest to date. However, the country managed to clinch only a single gold, its worst result in history by that parameter.

Medalists

| width="78%" align="left" valign="top" |

| width="22%" align="left" valign="top" |

Competitors

The following is the list of number of competitors in the Games.

Archery

Three Ukrainian archers qualified for the women's events by reaching the quarterfinal stage of the women's team recurve at the 2019 World Archery Championships in 's-Hertogenbosch, Netherlands.

Artistic swimming

Ukraine fielded a squad of eight artistic swimmers to compete in the women's duet and team event by obtaining one of two highest-ranked spots, not yet qualified, in the team free routine at the 2019 FINA World Championships in Gwangju, South Korea.

Athletics

Ukrainian athletes achieved the entry standards, either by qualifying time or by world ranking, in the following track and field events (up to a maximum of 3 athletes in each event):

Track & road events
Men

Women

Mixed

Field events
Men

Women

Badminton

Ukraine entered two badminton players for each of the following events into the Olympic tournament after received reallocation quota by the BWF.

Boxing

Ukraine entered one male boxer into the Olympic tournament. Rio 2016 Olympian and 2019 European Games silver medalist Mykola Butsenko scored a round-of-16 victory to secure a spot in the men's featherweight division at the 2020 European Qualification Tournament in London, United Kingdom.

Canoeing

Slalom
Ukraine qualified one canoeist for the women's K-1 class by finishing in the top eighteen at the 2019 ICF Canoe Slalom World Championships in La Seu d'Urgell, Spain.

Sprint

Ukrainian canoeists qualified five boats in each of the following distances for the Games through the 2019 ICF Canoe Sprint World Championships in Szeged, Hungary. Meanwhile, one additional boat was awarded to the Ukrainian canoeist in the men's C-1 1000 m by winning the gold medal at the 2021 European Canoe Sprint Qualification Regatta.

Men

Women

Qualification Legend: FA = Qualify to final (medal); FB = Qualify to final B (non-medal)

Cycling

Road
Ukraine entered one rider each to compete in the men's and women's Olympic road race, by virtue of his top 50 national finish (for men) and her top 100 individual finish (for women) in the UCI World Ranking.

Track
Following the completion of the 2020 UCI Track Cycling World Championships, Ukraine entered at least one rider to compete in the women's sprint and keirin, based on her final individual UCI Olympic rankings.

Sprint

Team sprint

Qualification legend: FA=Gold medal final; FB=Bronze medal final

Keirin

Mountain biking
Ukraine qualified one female mountain bikers, based on the UCI Olympic Mountain Biking rankings.

Diving

Ukrainian divers qualified for four individual spots and a synchronized team in the men's platform at the Games. Three of them finished in the top twelve of their respective events at the 2019 FINA World Championships, while another diver secured an outright berth in the women's platform at the 2019 European Championships in Kyiv. The men's synchronized platform pair scored the last of the four available berths by finishing seventh in the preliminary round at the 2021 FINA World Cup series in Tokyo, Japan.

Equestrian

Ukraine entered two riders into the Olympic equestrian competition by finishing in the top two, outside the group selection, of the individual FEI Olympic Rankings for Group C (Central and Eastern Europe) in both dressage and jumping, respectively.

Dressage

Qualification Legend: Q = Qualified for the final; q = Qualified for the final as a lucky loser

Jumping

Fencing

Ukrainian fencers qualified a full squad in the men's team épée at the Games by finishing among the top four nations in the FIE Olympic Team Rankings. Going to her fourth consecutive Games, multiple medalist and four-time world champion Olha Kharlan claimed a spot in the women's sabre as one of the two highest-ranked fencers vying for qualification from Europe in the FIE Adjusted Official Rankings, while two-time Olympian Olena Kryvytska rounded out the Ukrainian roster by winning the final match of the women's épée at the European Zonal Qualifier in Madrid, Spain.

Gymnastics

Artistic
Ukraine fielded a full team of five artistic gymnasts (four men and one woman) into the Olympic competition. The men's squad claimed one of the remaining nine spots in the team all-around, while Diana Varinska accepted the berth as a lone Ukrainian female gymnast in the individual all-around and apparatus events at the 2019 World Championships in Stuttgart, Germany.

Men
Team

Individual

Women

Rhythmic 

Ukraine qualified a squad of rhythmic gymnasts for the individual and group all-around by finishing in the top 16 (for individual) and top 5 (for group), respectively, at the 2019 World Championships in Baku, Azerbaijan.

Judo
 
Ukraine entered seven judoka (four men and three women) into the Olympic tournament based on the International Judo Federation Olympics Individual Ranking.

Men

Women

Karate

Ukraine entered three karateka into the inaugural Olympic tournament. 2019 European Games champion Stanislav Horuna (men's 75 kg) and silver medalist Anzhelika Terliuga (women's 55 kg) qualified directly for their respective kumite categories by finishing among the top four karateka at the end of the combined WKF Olympic Rankings.

Modern pentathlon
 
Ukrainian athletes qualified for the following spots to compete in modern pentathlon. Pavlo Tymoshchenko booked second of eight available spots at world ranking.

Rowing

Ukraine qualified one boat in the men's lightweight double sculls for the Games by winning the gold medal and securing the first of two berths available at the 2021 FISA European Olympic Qualification Regatta in Varese, Italy.

Qualification Legend: FA=Final A (medal); FB=Final B (non-medal); FC=Final C (non-medal); FD=Final D (non-medal); FE=Final E (non-medal); FF=Final F (non-medal); SA/B=Semifinals A/B; SC/D=Semifinals C/D; SE/F=Semifinals E/F; QF=Quarterfinals; R=Repechage

Shooting

Ukrainian shooters achieved quota places for the following events by virtue of their best finishes at the 2018 ISSF World Championships, the 2019 ISSF World Cup series, European Championships or Games, and European Qualifying Tournament, as long as they obtained a minimum qualifying score (MQS) by May 31, 2020.

Swimming

Ukrainian swimmers further achieved qualifying standards in the following events (up to a maximum of 2 swimmers in each event at the Olympic Qualifying Time (OQT), and potentially 1 at the Olympic Selection Time (OST)):

Men

Women

Table tennis
 
Ukraine entered three athlete into the table tennis competition at the Games. Two-time Olympian Kou Lei (2008 and 2016) booked his third trip to the Games by winning the second-stage final match of the men's singles at the European Qualification Tournament in Odivelas, Portugal.

Tennis

Triathlon

Ukraine sent one triathlete to compete at the Games. She was disqualified prior to the start of the race due to a positive doping test.

Individual

Weightlifting

Ukrainian weightlifters qualified for two quota places at the games, based on the Tokyo 2020 Rankings Qualification List of 11 June 2021.

Wrestling

Ukraine qualified ten wrestlers for each of the following classes into the Olympic competition. Five of them finished among the top six to book Olympic spots in the men's freestyle 125 kg, men's Greco-Roman (60 and 87 kg) and women's freestyle (50 and 68 kg) at the 2019 World Championships, while two additional licenses were awarded to the Ukrainian wrestlers, who progressed to the top two finals of the women's freestyle 57 and 62 kg, respectively, at the 2021 European Qualification Tournament in Budapest, Hungary. Three Ukrainian wrestlers claimed one of the remaining slots each in the men's freestyle 74 kg, women's freestyle 76 kg, and men's Greco-Roman 67 kg, respectively, to complete the nation's roster at the 2021 World Qualification Tournament in Sofia, Bulgaria.

Freestyle

Greco-Roman

See also

References

Nations at the 2020 Summer Olympics
2020
2021 in Ukrainian sport